Alejandro Vicente López y Planes (May 3, 1785 – October 10, 1856) was an Argentine writer and politician who acted as interim President of Argentina from July 7 to August 18, 1827. He also wrote the lyrics of the Argentine National Anthem adopted on May 11, 1813.

Early life 
López began his primary studies in the San Francisco School, and later studied in the Real Colegio San Carlos, today the Colegio Nacional de Buenos Aires.  He obtained a doctorate of laws in the University of Chuquisaca.  He served as a captain in the Patriotic Regiment during the English invasions.  After the Argentine victory he composed a poem entitled El triunfo argentino (The Argentine Triumph).

Political life 
He participated in the Cabildo Abierto of May 22, 1810, and supported the formation of the Primera Junta.  He had good relations with Manuel Belgrano.  When the royalist members of the city government of Buenos Aires were expelled, he was elected mayor of the city; he was an enemy of the party of Cornelio Saavedra and one of the creators of the First Triumvirate, of which he was the Treasurer.

Like many other nineteenth century Argentines prominent in public life, he was a freemason.

López was a member of the Constituent Assembly of year XIII, representing Buenos Aires.  At the request of the Assembly, he wrote the lyrics to a "patriotic march", which eventually became the Argentine National Anthem.  It was a military march, whose music was composed by the Catalan Blas Parera; it was approved on March 11, 1813.  The first public reading was at a tertulia on May 7 in the house of Mariquita Sánchez de Thompson.  It displaced a different march, written by Esteban de Luca, which would have been the anthem if not for the more militaristic Lopez.

López participated in the government of Carlos María de Alvear, and with his fall he was sent to prison.  He held a few more public offices, and was then named Secretary of the Constituent Congress of 1825, and, a little later, minister for the president Bernardino Rivadavia.

After the scandal of negotiations with the Brazilian Empire, Rivadavia resigned the presidency.  In his place, López was elected as caretaker, signing the dissolution of the Congress and calling elections in Buenos Aires.  The new governor, Manuel Dorrego took charge of the ministry; this unified the federalists.  When Dorrego fell from grace and was executed by firing squad by Juan Lavalle, Lopez was exiled to Uruguay.

Late years 
He returned in 1830 as a member of the Tribunal of Justice for Juan Manuel de Rosas.  He was president of the Tribunal for many years and, among other things, presided over the judgement of the assassins of Juan Facundo Quiroga.

He was president of the literary salon led by Marcos Sastre, but was not part of the group known as the Generation of '37, to which belonged his two sons, Vicente Fidel López and Lucio Vicente López.

See also
List of heads of state of Argentina

References

External links 
 
  
 

1785 births
1856 deaths
People from Buenos Aires
Argentine people of Spanish descent
Presidents of Argentina
19th-century Argentine lawyers
National anthem writers
People of the Argentine War of Independence
Burials at La Recoleta Cemetery
University of Charcas alumni
Argentine Freemasons